Rick Farmiloe (born December 28, 1956) is an American animator and sequence director who has worked for various studios, including Walt Disney Animation Studios, Rich Animation Studios and DreamWorks.

Shorts, commercials, etc.
Kung Fu Panda 2 – Animated short for DreamWorks DVD
November 2010 – March 2011 20 min.
How To Train Your Dragon -animated short for DreamWorks’ DVD
March 2010 – June 2010 12 min.
Mickey Mouse Cruise Line Spot
January 2010 – February 2010
Princess and the Frog
May 2009 – present
Timon and Pumba: Water Safety
January 2009
Snoopy Commercials
2008 – 2010
Kung Fu Panda (Secrets of the Furious Five)
May – July 2008
Brian Wilson Project
2007–2008
Timon and Pumba: Safety Smart
December 2007

Television

Film

Video Games

Music videos
Robert Schwartzman Solo
2010 -2011
Susan Egan Video
2011
Rooney
2010 – 2011
Opposites Attract
1989

References

External links

1956 births
Living people
People from Santa Rosa, California
American animators
American animated film directors
American animated film producers
American music video directors
Walt Disney Animation Studios people